Merceline Wayodi (born 5 July 1995) is a Kenyan professional footballer who plays as a midfielder for Kenyan Women's Premier League club Vihiga Queens FC and the Kenya women's national team.

International career 
Wayodi made her debut for the team in a 2022 African Cup of Nations qualifiers against South Sudan.

See also
List of Kenya women's international footballers

References

External links 

 

Living people
Kenyan women's footballers
1995 births
Women's association football midfielders
Kenya women's international footballers